Attapur is a major commercial and residential area located in South western Hyderabad, Telangana. It is named behind a local muslim zamindar or land lord, Nawab Attaullah.  

It provides connectivity to the Rajiv Gandhi International Airport. The P.V. Narasimha Rao Expressway passes through Attapur. Being close to Mehdipatnam and Rajendranagar is an added advantage for Attapur. 

The National Academy of Customs Indirect Taxes and Narcotics (NACIN) has its Zonal Training Institute at Attapur. The Rajendranagar Sub-Divisional Magistrate and Revenue division Office is located here. The XVI Additional Metropolitan Magistrate Court, Rajendranagar is near Attapur. The Attapur Regional Transport Office is one of the biggest in Hyderabad and is well known as it covers many areas under its jurisdiction. The multiplex Cinépolis is renowned for its sound system, ambience, and seating; people from many surrounding localities come to Cinépolis to watch films. The Himayat Sagar reservoir is close to Attapur. The retailers Walmart and Metro Cash and Carry are near Attapur. 

The 225-year-old Rambagh Ramalayam temple structure and premises have earned the Indian National Trust for Art and Cultural Heritage(INTACH) Heritage award for 2015. Attapur has many mosques. There is a considerable amount of Muslim population in Attapur. 

There is a Swayambhu Anantha Padmanabhaswamy Temple in Attapur. It is stated that the Lord Anantha Padmanabhaswamy has been worshiping here for 1100 years. Sikh oldest Gurudwara of Hyderabad, Puratan Gurudwara Sahib Asha Singh Bagh, built in 1832 is also present near Attapur. Mushakmahal a 1681 built palace is also present in center of attapur.

P.V. Narasimha Rao Telangana Veterinary University, Sardar Vallabhbhai Patel National Police Academy, National Institute of Rural Development, National Institute of Agricultural Extension Management, National Academy of Agricultural Research Management, Professor Jayashankar Telangana State Agricultural University, Sri Konda Laxman Telangana State Horticultural University are close to Attapur. The place is also having a famous Ahl e Hadees Masjid behind hotel Swagat Grand. The Qutub Shahi Masjid of Attapur conducts many lectures on Contemporary challenges and opportunities of Muslims of India. The Masjid e Quba conducts open Mosque day to invite non Muslims to Masjid as a part of communal harmony.

DMart, Spencer's Retail, Ghanshayam and Vijetha are big supermarkets available around Attapur. Mantra Mall and MCube mall provides options of entertainment. There are many food courts like McDonald's, Subway, Pizza Hut, Dominos, Paradise, KFC, BurgerKing, SVM and Palamuru Grill are available. Zoi Hospitals, Germanten Hospital and Premier hospitals, Mythri Hospitals are available around this area. South India Shopping Mall is one of the biggest dresses showroom in Attapur. For moviegoers Asian Cinemas and Cinepolis are the best choice. For Emergency and Non Emergency Ambulance booking in Attapur area Dial +917330108108 Near by Ambulance Service  SK Ambulance Services in Hyderabad

References

Neighbourhoods in Hyderabad, India